Chris Hoy is an American politician and retired law enforcement officer who is the current mayor of Salem, Oregon. He also formerly served as a member of the Oregon House of Representatives from the 21st district. He was appointed to the House on December 8, 2021. In 2022, he won the election for mayor of Salem, and was set to take office in 2023. However, following the resignation of Chuck Bennett, the former mayor of Salem, Hoy took office on November 2, 2022 instead.

Background 
Hoy earned a Bachelor of Arts degree in political science and English from Willamette University. He served as an officer in the Clackamas County Sheriff's Office for 30 years. He was elected to the Salem, Oregon City Council in 2017.

References 

Democratic Party members of the Oregon House of Representatives
Living people
People from Salem, Oregon
Politicians from Salem, Oregon
Willamette University alumni
Year of birth missing (living people)